The 12-pounder long gun was an intermediary calibre piece of artillery mounted on warships of the Age of sail. They were used as main guns on the most typical frigates of the early 18th century, on the second deck of fourth-rate ships of the line, and on the upper decks or castles of 80-gun and 120-gun ships of the line. Naval 12-pounders were similar to 12-pound Army guns in the Gribeauval system: the canon lourd de 12 Gribeauval, used as a siege weapon, and the canon de 12 Gribeauval, which was considered a heavy field artillery piece.

Usage 
As the 12-pounder calibre was consistent with both the French and the British calibre systems, it was a widespread gun amongst nations between the 17th and the 19th century. From the late 18th century, the French Navy used the 12-pounder in three capacities: as main gun on early frigates under Louis XIV, on standard frigates under Louis XV and on light frigates under Louis XVI; as secondary artillery on 64-gun ships; to arm the castles of 80-gun ships of the line; and to equip the third deck of early first-rate ships.

Under Louis XIV, frigates were organised into "first-rank frigates", which were small two-deckers comparable in role to the 60-gun ships of the 19th century, and smaller "second-rank" frigates. The first-rank frigates carried the 12-pounder as main artillery on their lower deck. Hermione was captured by the British in 1757 and was swiftly imitated. Under Louis XVI, the heavier 18-pounder frigate became predominant, with over 130 units produced, but the French Navy still had around 70 lighter 12-pounder frigates in commission.

On 64-gun two-deckers, the 12-gun was used as secondary artillery, to supplement the 24-pounder main batteries. 28 guns were carried on the top gun-deck.

Larger units used the 12-pounder to complement the firepower provided by their main and secondary artillery. While the secondary artillery of these 100-gun ships evolved from 18-pounders to 24-pounders, the 12-pounder remained the standard gun on the third deck until 1803, when the  ship Impérial became the first 120-gun to carry 18-pounders on her third battery.

In the Royal Navy, the 12-pounder was used in a similar capacity. The 12-pounder also equipped the castles on razeed ships, where 12 pieces were mounted, and the 22-gun secondary battery of 50-gun fourth-rates. Finally, 30 were installed on the third deck of 90-gun second-rates.

Sources and references 

  Jean Boudriot et Hubert Berti, L'Artillerie de mer : marine française 1650-1850, Paris, éditions Ancre, 1992 (notice BNF no FRBNF355550752).
  Jean Peter, L'artillerie et les fonderies de la marine sous Louis XIV, Paris, Economica, 1995, 213 p..

Naval guns of France
120 mm artillery